The 1991 Texas Tech Red Raiders football team represented Texas Tech University as a member of the Southwest Conference (SWC) during the 1991 NCAA Division I-A football season. In their fifth season under head coach Spike Dykes, the Red Raiders compiled a 6–5 record (5–3 against SWC opponents), finished in a tie for second place in the conference, and outscored opponents by a combined total of 315 to 272. The team played its home games at Clifford B. and Audrey Jones Stadium in Lubbock, Texas.

Schedule

References

Texas Tech
Texas Tech Red Raiders football seasons
Texas Tech Red Raiders football